White Cloud Peak 10, also known as WCP 10, at  above sea level is an unofficially named peak in the White Cloud Mountains of Idaho. It is the 89th highest peak in Idaho. Sheep Lake is directly south of the peak, and Tin Cup Lake is directly north of the peak.

References 

Mountains of Custer County, Idaho
Mountains of Idaho
Sawtooth National Forest